Pat McCormick (June 30, 1927 – July 29, 2005) was an American actor and comedy writer known for playing Big Enos Burdette in Smokey and the Bandit and its two sequels. He wrote for a number of performers such as Red Skelton, Phyllis Diller and Johnny Carson as well as for shows including Get Smart. McCormick had a distinctive appearance being 6'7" tall, weighing 250 lbs and having a walrus mustache.

Early life
McCormick was born in Lakewood, Ohio on June 30, 1927. He was a 1945 graduate of Rocky River High School.

Career
McCormick was a high school athlete and served in the United States Army during World War II. He then enrolled at Harvard University as a freshman in the autumn of 1947 where he played basketball that year. He later dropped basketball to concentrate on track (hurdles). He dropped out of Harvard Law School for a career in advertising, but abandoned that career as well when he started writing jokes for television and standup comedians, including Jonathan Winters. Eventually, he became a writer for The Jack Paar Show. He wrote for Get Smart, The Danny Kaye Show and wrote and appeared on Candid Camera. He was also a member of the I've Got a Secret production staff in the early 1960s.

McCormick was both the announcer and straight man for Don Rickles on The Don Rickles Show in 1968. He was a regular on The New Bill Cosby Show in 1972. Behind the scenes, he was one of the lead writers on The Tonight Show writing many of its most well-known lines. He wrote the line "Due to today's earthquake, the God is Dead rally has been canceled." As part of a skit on a Jonathan Winters special McCormick, as a court jester, quipped to the regally-attired Winters "Is that a scepter in your pocket, or are you just happy to see me?" a quite risque line for early 1970s television.

His first screen performance was in The Shaggy D.A. in 1976. He played President Grover Cleveland in Robert Altman's Buffalo Bill and the Indians, or Sitting Bull's History Lesson in the same year. In 1977, he appeared in Smokey and the Bandit and appeared in the sequels in both 1980 and 1983, alongside Paul Williams as wealthy con men Big and Little Enos Burdette respectively. Pat appeared in the 1982 TV movie Rooster, which also starred Williams. He appeared as the Ghost of Christmas Present in a TV production in the Bill Murray comedy Scrooged in 1988, with his final appearance being in Ted & Venus.

Retirement and death
Living in Palm Springs, California in 1996, McCormick retired in 1998 after being left partly paralyzed by a stroke. According to fellow writer Mark Evanier, McCormick was driving to the Beverly Hilton Hotel when he suffered a stroke and crashed his car into a concrete wall. The vehicle caught fire, but a woman named Danielle Villegas pulled him out and dragged him to safety before the car exploded. McCormick was admitted to the Motion Picture and Television Country House and Hospital in Woodland Hills, California, where he spent the remainder of his life. He died there seven years later, aged 78.

He was interred in Forest Lawn Memorial Park in Hollywood Hills. He was survived by a son, Ben, and two grandsons.

Filmography

References

External links
 

1927 births
2005 deaths
People from Rocky River, Ohio
American male film actors
American male television actors
American male voice actors
Male actors from Palm Springs, California
Harvard Law School alumni
Male actors from Ohio
Writers Guild of America Award winners
Burials at Forest Lawn Memorial Park (Hollywood Hills)
20th-century American male actors
Rocky River High School (Ohio) alumni